Thomas Robert Dooley (born December 9, 1945, in San Francisco, California) is an American racewalker who competed in the 1968 Summer Olympics and in the 1972 Summer Olympics.

References

1945 births
Living people
American male racewalkers
Olympic track and field athletes of the United States
Athletes (track and field) at the 1968 Summer Olympics
Athletes (track and field) at the 1972 Summer Olympics
Track and field athletes from San Francisco
Pan American Games medalists in athletics (track and field)
Pan American Games silver medalists for the United States
Athletes (track and field) at the 1967 Pan American Games
Athletes (track and field) at the 1971 Pan American Games
Medalists at the 1971 Pan American Games